The Merri Soul Sessions or Paul Kelly Presents: The Merri Soul Sessions is the twentieth studio album by Australian musician, Paul Kelly, which was issued on 12 December 2014 on his own label, Gawdaggie Records, and distributed by Universal Music Australia. Kelly provided lead vocals on two of its eleven tracks, the rest featured vocals by either Clairy Browne, sisters Vika and Linda Bull, Kira Puru, or Dan Sultan. The album debuted at No. 17 on the ARIA Albums Chart.

Background 

The Merri Soul Sessions is the twentieth studio album by Australian musician, Paul Kelly, which was issued on 12 December 2014 on his own label, Gawdaggie Records, and distributed by Universal Music Australia. Kelly had developed the concept after hearing Vika Bull sing lead vocals on her live version of his song, "Sweet Guy" – originally released as a single in June 1989 – during touring as a backing singer in his group. For the album Kelly provided lead vocals on two tracks and invited various vocalists to sing lead on the other nine of eleven tracks. Tracks feature lead vocals by Vika Bull, Linda Bull (Vika's sister), Clairy Browne, Kira Puru or Dan Sultan.

The album was recorded live-in-the-studio in Northcote, with Kelly co-producing with Steve Schram (Clairy Browne & The Bangin' Rackettes), alongside the Merri Creek, which gave the album its name. Kelly explained his concept to Australian Musicians junocreative, "I started to imagine a soul revue type record performed live in the studio with a variety of singers and the one band."

Prior to the album's appearance Kelly released four double A-sided 7" vinyl singles, "The Merri Soul Singles, Volume 1" (July 2014), "The Merri Soul Singles, Volume 2" (August), "The Merri Soul Singles, Volume 3" (October) and "The Merri Soul Singles, Volume 4" (November). Kelly promoted the album with a national tour from January to February 2015. He was supported by Hiatus Kaiyote, a neo-soul quartet from Melbourne.

Reception 

On the ARIA Albums Chart, The Merri Soul Sessions peaked at No. 17. Noel Mengel of News Limited's website, news.com.au, rated the album as four out of five stars and felt "[i]t's one of those records where you feel the spirit start to finish, nothing too fussed over, no one going through the motions. There's desperation in the lyrics and a lot of joy in the delivery. And all the best soul music has those two essential ingredients."

Michael Dwyer of The Age praised Browne's vocals on "Keep on Coming Back for More", which had been performed live by Kelly four years earlier on The A – Z Recordings (September 2010, as "I Keep on Coming Back for More"), as a track that was "waiting for Browne's extraordinary voice to send it up in flames." Kelly's nephew, Dan Kelly, was "firing jolts of electric guitar across the bow" while "Kelly rocks back and holds down the tense rhythm. Despite the modest tools at hand, it seems less likely the song will fall apart than that Browne will blow it inside out." Kelly agreed that some of his songs were better when sung by other vocalists. Charles Pitter of PopMatters was of the view that "the band and vocal performances show off the breadth of Australia's talent and the songs are of consistently high standard".

Track listing

Personnel 

Musicians
 Clairy Browne – lead vocals, backing vocals
 Cameron Bruce – keyboards
 Linda Bull – lead vocals, backing vocals
 Vika Bull – lead vocals, backing vocals
 Dan Kelly – guitar
 Paul Kelly – rhythm guitar, vocals
 Peter Luscombe – drums, percussion
 Bill McDonald – bass guitar
 Ashley Naylor – guitar
 Kira Puru – lead vocals, backing vocals
 Dan Sultan – lead vocals, backing vocals

Recording details
 Paul Kelly – producer
 Bruce Lucey – mastering
 Steven Schram – engineer, mixing, producer

Artwork
 Andy Doherty – booklet
 Jeff Fasano – cover art
 Paul Kelly – liner notes
 Mark Roper – cover art
 Peter Salmon-Lomas – artwork, design

Chart performance

References 

2014 albums
Paul Kelly (Australian musician) albums